Verno is a mountain in Greece.

Verno may also refer to:

Buz Verno (born 1953), American musician
Ilpo Verno (born 1981), Finnish footballer
Jerry Verno (1895–1975), English actor
Verno Phillips (born 1969), Belizean boxer